Armageddon USA, commonly known as Armageddon, is a Christian thrash metal band that originated in Falls Church, Virginia.

History
The band began in 1985, under the name Second Chance with vocalist Mike Vance and guitarist Robby Lee. In 1987, the two added the talents of bassist Danny Wilkinson and drummer Mark Miley. The next year, 1988, the band changed their name to Armageddon. Soon after the name change, Miley departed from the band. The band added Joe Hasselvander (Raven, Pentagram, Cathedral) to the drums and the band began recording their debut album, The Money Mask. The album featured various musicians, playing various instruments, including 12-string guitars and keyboards. The band kept performing until 2005, when they disbanded. In 2007, the band reissued the album, through Retroactive Records. Around 2008, there was an article titled "Armageddon: Where Are They Now?" that was written by HM Magazine. In 2013, the band reunited with the same lineup, alongside guitarist Robert "PJ" Bussey. In 2015, the band released their sophomore album, Up In Flames, which was released independently. On October 7, 2017, the band announced that they were recording their third full-length album.

Members
Current
Michael "Mike" Vance - Vocals (1985-2005, 2013-present)
 "Robby Lee"  - Guitars (1985-2005, 2013-present)
Robert "PJ" Bussey - Guitars (1988-2005, 2013-present)
Daniel "Danny" Wilkinson - Bass (1987-2005, 2013-present)
Joe Hasselvander - Drums (1989-2005, 2013-present)

Former
Mark Miley - Drums (1987-1989)
Scott St. James - Drums (1989)

Session
John Gallagher - Bass (2015-present)
Phil Zeo - Guitars, 12-string (1989)
Charlie Philips - Guitars, Backing Vocals (1989)
Lamont Coward - Keyboards (1989)
Paul Krueger - Backing Vocals (1989)
Janusz Smulski - Keyboards (1989)

Discography

As Second Chance
Demos
 Demo (1987)
 Second Chance (1987)
 The Blazing Wasteland (1988)

Compilation appearances
 East Coast Metal (1988; Regency)

As Armageddon
Studio albums
 The Money Mask (1989; Talkingtown)
 The Money Mask (2007; Retroactive, Reissue)
 Up In Flames (2015)

Compilation appearances
 Metal from the Dragon Vol. 1 (2017; The Bearded Dragon Productions)

References

External links
 Twitter
 Instagram

Musical groups established in 1985
Musical groups disestablished in 2005
Musical groups reestablished in 2013
American thrash metal musical groups
American Christian metal musical groups
1985 establishments in Virginia